Intellectual humility is the acceptance that one's beliefs and opinions could be wrong. Other characteristics which may accompany intellectual humility include a low concern for status and an acceptance of one's intellectual limitations.

Intellectual humility is often described as an intellectual virtue. It is contrasted with other perceived virtues and vices such as open-mindedness, intellectual courage, arrogance, vanity and servility. It can be understood as lying between the extremes of intellectual arrogance/servility or diffidence, and intellectual dogmatism/timidity.

Definitions 
While intellectual humility as an independent and focused area of study is a recent phenomenon, the presence of humility in discourse dates back many centuries. Waclaw Bąk et al. identify Socrates as "the ideal example" of intellectual humility. Studies by Abraham Maslow, Carl Rogers and Gordon Allport discuss humility with regard to one's knowledge without using the phrase intellectual humility. In 1990, Richard Paul presented intellectual humility as a critical thinking disposition, interdependent with other traits such as intellectual courage. He defined it as "Awareness of the limits of one's knowledge, including sensitivity to circumstances in which one’s native egocentrism is likely to function self-deceptively; sensitivity to bias and prejudice in, and limitations of one's viewpoint". Paul adds "It does not imply spinelessness or submissiveness. It implies the lack of intellectual pretentiousness, boastfulness, or conceit, combined with insight into the logical foundations, or lack of such foundations, of one’s beliefs."

In recent times, one of the first focused studies of intellectual humility was conducted by Roberts and Woods in 2003. A lot of the literature on intellectual humility is about attempting to frame definitions. Conceptions of humility include proper belief, underestimation of strengths, low concern, limitation owning, as well as semantic clusters, cluster of attitudes, and confidence management.

Doxastic definition 
Ian M. Church and Peter L. Samuelson proposed a doxastic account of intellectual humility. They considered intellectual humility as a virtue, one of valuing one's own beliefs "as he or she ought". They argued humility is the "virtuous mean" between arrogance and self-depreciation.

People are intellectually arrogant when they erroneously evaluate their intellectual capacity higher than warranted, resulting in them being more closed-minded and biased than the intellectually humble person. People who are intellectually diffident are those who fail "to appropriately recognize or appreciate their intellectual achievements." Such a person is less inclined to speak out when he or she encounters wrong information.

See also 

 Skepticism

References

Cited works

Books

Further reading 

Virtue
Intellectualism
Humility